The Choice City Rebels was a roller derby league based in Fort Collins, Colorado. Founded in 2009, the league last fielded a single team which competed against teams from other leagues.

The league was founded in October 2009 by ten established skaters, who had previously played for FoCo Girls Gone Derby, and it held its first bout in December, against the Slaughterhouse Derby Girls.  In 2011, it reached the final of the roller derby tournament at the Greeley Stampede, where it again faced the Slaughterhouse team.

Choice City was accepted into the Women's Flat Track Derby Association Apprentice Program in July 2010, and became a full member of the WFTDA in March 2011. At the end of 2012 Choice City refocused as a co-ed and banked track league.

WFTDA rankings

References

Sports in Fort Collins, Colorado
Roller derby leagues established in 2009
Roller derby leagues in Colorado
Former Women's Flat Track Derby Association leagues
2009 establishments in Colorado